Gallatin County is located in the U.S. state of Montana. With its county seat in Bozeman, it is the second-most populous county in Montana, with a population of 118,960 in the 2020 Census.

The county's prominent geographical features are the Bridger mountains in the north, and the Gallatin mountains and Gallatin River in the south, named by Meriwether Lewis in 1805 for Albert Gallatin, the United States Treasury Secretary who formulated the Lewis and Clark Expedition.

At the southern end of the county, West Yellowstone's entrance into Yellowstone National Park accounts for around half of all park visitors. Big Sky Resort, one of the largest ski resorts in the United States, lies in Gallatin and neighboring Madison counties, midway between Bozeman and West Yellowstone.

History
During the territorial era, a small patch of land known as "Lost Dakota" existed as a remote exclave of Dakota Territory until it was transferred to Gallatin County, Montana Territory, in 1873.

Geography
The county attained its present boundaries in 1978, when the former Yellowstone National Park (part) county-equivalent was dissolved and apportioned between Gallatin County and Park County. The geographies transferred are known now as Census Tract 14 in Gallatin County, and as Census Tract 6 in Park County.

Major highways

  Interstate 90
  U.S. Highway 20
  U.S. Highway 191
  U.S. Highway 287
  Montana Highway 2
  Montana Highway 64
  Montana Highway 84
  Montana Highway 85
  Montana Highway 86
  Montana Secondary Highway 205

Adjacent counties

 Madison County - west
 Jefferson County - northwest
 Broadwater County - north
 Meagher County - northeast
 Park County - east
 Park County, Wyoming - southeast
 Teton County, Wyoming - southeast
 Fremont County, Idaho - southwest

National protected areas
 Gallatin National Forest (part)
 Yellowstone National Park (part)

Demographics

2000 census
As of the 2000 United States census, there were 67,831 people, 26,323 households, and 16,188 families living in the county. The population density was 26 people per square mile (10/km2). There were 29,489 housing units at an average density of 11 per square mile (4/km2). The racial makeup of the county was:
 96.20% White
 0.23% Black or African American
 0.88% Native American
 0.89% Asian
 0.06% Pacific Islander
 0.54% from other races
 1.19% from two or more races

1.54% of the population were Hispanic or Latino of any race. 23.7% were of German, 11.2% Irish, 10.4% English, 9.0% Norwegian and 5.5% American ancestry.

In the county households, 29.70% had children under the age of 18 living with them, 51.80% were married couples living together, 6.60% had a female householder with no husband present, and 38.50% were non-families. 24.10% of all households were made up of individuals, and 5.70% had someone living alone who was 65 years of age or older. The average household size was 2.46 and the average family size was 2.94.

The county population contained 22.00% under the age of 18, 18.50% from 18 to 24, 30.40% from 25 to 44, 20.60% from 45 to 64, and 8.50% who were 65 years of age or older. The median age was 31 years. For every 100 females there were 108.30 males. For every 100 females age 18 and over, there were 108.70 males.

The median income for a household in the county was $38,120, and the median income for a family was $46,639. Males had a median income of $30,866 versus $21,330 for females. The per capita income for the county was $19,074. About 6.30% of families and 12.80% of the population were below the poverty line, including 10.50% of those under age 18 and 5.60% of those age 65 or over.

2010 census
As of the 2010 United States census, there were 89,513 people, 36,550 households, and 21,263 families living in the county. The racial makeup of the county was 95.1% White, 1.1% Asian, 0.9% American Indian, 0.3% Black or African American, 0.1% Pacific Islander, 0.7% from other races, and 1.9% from two or more races. Those of Hispanic or Latino origin made up 2.8% of the population. In terms of ancestry, 32.2% were German, 18.1% were Irish, 14.7% were English, 9.4% were Norwegian, and 3.5% were American.

Of the 36,550 households, 27.8% had children under the age of 18 living with them, 47.8% were married couples living together, 6.6% had a female householder with no husband present, 41.8% were non-families, and 27.3% of all households were made up of individuals. The average household size was 2.36 and the average family size was 2.90. The median age was 32.5 years.

The median income for a household in the county was $50,136 and the median income for a family was $65,029. Males had a median income of $42,245 versus $31,349 for females. The per capita income for the county was $27,423. About 7.4% of families and 13.5% of the population were below the poverty line, including 12.5% of those under age 18 and 8.2% of those age 65 or over.

2020 Census
As of the 2020 census, there were 118,960 people and 46,990 households living in the county. The racial make of the county was 89.0% White, 1.2% Asian, 0.9% American Indian, 0.4% Black of African American, 0.1% Pacific Islander, 1.8% from other races, and 6.6% from two or more races. Those of Hispanic of Latino origin made up 5.0% of the population. In terms of ancestry, 25.4% were German, 14.8% were Irish, 12.4% were English, 8.8% were Norwegian, 4.6% were Italian, 4.0% were French, 3.5% were Scottish, 2.2% were Polish and 0.3% were Subsaharan African. 

Of the 46,990 households, 48.2% were a Married-couple family household, 23.9% were a "Male householder, no spouse present, family household", and 20.4% were a "Female householder, no spouse present, family household". The averager family size was 2.96 in the county. The median age was 33.1 years old, compared with 40.1 in Montana.   

The median income for a household in the county was $75,418 in the county, significantly higher than the $57,153 median household income in all of Montana. 11.9% of the population was below the poverty line, including 6.9% of those under 18 and 6.5% of those over 65.

Government and politics
Gallatin County has traditionally favored Republican presidential candidates, often by large margins. Recent changes to Gallatin County's demographics (including migration from Democratic-leaning areas, and younger voters adopting more liberal political positions) have made the county more competitive.

Democratic candidates Barack Obama and Hillary Clinton narrowly won Gallatin County in 2008 and 2016 respectively, with Republican Mitt Romney winning in 2012. 2020 Democratic candidate Joe Biden won Gallatin County by the largest margin for a Democrat since Franklin Delano Roosevelt's victory in 1940.

Communities

Cities
 Belgrade
 Bozeman (county seat)
 Three Forks

Towns
 Manhattan
 West Yellowstone

Census-designated places

 Amsterdam (formerly Amsterdam-Churchill)
 Big Sky
 Bridger
 Churchill (formerly Amsterdam-Churchill)
 Four Corners
 Gallatin Gateway
 Gallatin River Ranch
 Hebgen Lake Estates
 King Arthur Park
 Logan
 Ponderosa Pines
 Sedan
 Springhill
 Willow Creek

Unincorporated communities

 Hillman
 Maudlow

Notable people
 Zales Ecton, a U.S. Senator from Montana, lived in Gallatin County.
 Stan Jones lives and works in Gallatin County.

See also
 List of lakes in Gallatin County, Montana
 List of mountains in Gallatin County, Montana
 National Register of Historic Places listings in Gallatin County, Montana
 Lost Dakota

References

External links
 Gallatin County, MT Official Website
 Gallatin County Emergency Management

 
1865 establishments in Montana Territory
Populated places established in 1865